Mandy Horsepool (born 18 May 1959) is a British speed skater. She competed in three events at the 1980 Winter Olympics.

References

External links
 

1959 births
Living people
British female speed skaters
Olympic speed skaters of Great Britain
Speed skaters at the 1980 Winter Olympics
Sportspeople from Nottingham